The 2011–12 FA Trophy is the 42nd season of the FA Trophy, the Football Association's cup competition for teams at levels 5–8 of the English football league system. A total of 266 clubs entered the competition.

The competition was won for the first time by York City, who defeated Newport County 2–0 in the Final at Wembley on 12 May 2012. Newport County became the second Welsh club to reach an FA Trophy final, after Bangor City in 1984.

Calendar

Preliminary round
Ties will be played on 8 October 2011.

Ties

Replays

† – After extra time

First round qualifying
Ties will be played on 22 October 2011 

Teams from Premier Division of Southern League, Northern Premier League and Isthmian League entered in this round.

Ties

Replays

† – After extra time

Second round qualifying
Ties will be played on 5 November 2011

Ties

Replays

† – After extra time

Third round qualifying
Ties will be played on 26 November 2011. This round is the first in which Conference North and South teams join the competition.

Ties

Replays

† – After extra time

First round
Ties will be played on 10 December 2011. This round is the first in which Conference Premier teams join those from lower reaches of the National League System.

Ties

Replays

Second round
Ties will be played on 14 January 2012.

Ties

Replays

† – After extra time

Third round
Ties will be played on 4 February 2012.

Ties

Replay

Quarter-finals
Ties will be played on 25 February 2012.

Ties

Semi-finals

First leg

Second leg

Newport County win 3–1 on aggregate

York City win 2–1 on aggregate

Final

References

General
 Football Club History Database: FA Trophy 2011–12

Specific

2011–12 domestic association football cups
Lea
2011-12